Tōdaiji Gakuen (東大寺学園 Tōdaiji Gakuen) is a private school, combined middle and high school in the city of Nara, Japan. It was founded in 1926 as an offshoot of the famous Tōdai-ji temple, and began as an evening middle school (夜間中学) for working students. Daytime education began in 1963, when the current name was adopted, and evening education was dropped in 1977.
Today, most of the students go on to the national universities, especially Kyoto University and University of Tokyo, or medical courses.

Noted alumni 
Tetsuji Nakamura, member of the House of Representatives
Kazuyoshi Shirahama, House of Councillors member
Shinichi Kitaoka, United Nations representative
Yasunami Ryosuke, associate justice of the Supreme Court of Japan
Takahiro Kimura, animator and character designer
Ichirō Sakaki, light novel writer
Banmei Takahashi, film director
Atsushi Yamanishi, actor
Shinichi Kitaoka, political scientist
Kan Kimura, Professor, Kobe University

External links
 Todaiji Gakuen

Buddhist schools in Japan
Educational institutions established in 1926
High schools in Nara Prefecture
Junior high schools in Japan
Private schools in Japan
Schools in Nara Prefecture
Boys' schools in Japan
1926 establishments in Japan